Karlodinium decipiens is a species of unarmored dinoflagellates from the genus Karlodinium. It was first isolated from the Australian region of the Southern Ocean, but has a widespread distribution, through the Southern Ocean to the Tasman Sea, to the coast of Spain. It is large-sized and is characterized by having a helicoidal chloroplast arrangement and a big central nucleus. It is considered potentially ichthyotoxic.

References

Further reading

External links

WORMS

Species described in 2008
Gymnodiniales